Seighford is a civil parish in the Borough of Stafford, Staffordshire, England.  It contains 21 listed buildings that are recorded in the National Heritage List for England. Of these, two are at Grade II*, the middle of the three grades, and the others are at Grade II, the lowest grade.  The parish contains the villages of Seighford, Derrington, and Great Bridgeford and the surrounding area.  Most of the listed buildings are houses, cottages and associated structures, farmhouses and farm buildings, and a high proportion of these are timber framed or have a timber framed core.  The other listed buildings consist of a church, a headstone in the churchyard, a public house, a bridge, and two mileposts.


Key

Buildings

References

Citations

Sources

Lists of listed buildings in Staffordshire